Rattlesnake is a steel wild mouse style roller coaster ride which opened in 1998 at the Chessington World of Adventures Resort in southwest London, England.

History

Rattlesnake is a steel wild mouse style roller coaster ride which opened in 1998 at Chessington World of Adventures Resort as the theme park's third coaster. It was designed by Ing.-Büro Stengel GmbH and manufactured by Maurer Söhne / Wilde Maus Classic. it is over 1000 feet long.

Due to local planning restrictions (a result of the park being on green belt land ) the land designated for the ride area was excavated, resulting in the ride being partially submerged below ground level.  The layout consists of a steep lift hill, sharp turns and small airtime hills.

In June 2015, both Rattlesnake and Dragon's Fury were closed down when an accident happened on The Smiler at Alton Towers.

Ride experience
The Rattlesnake is themed around a Mexican mine of the Wild West era, with the cars resembling mine carts and a number of wooden structures and animated figures. The installation of the ride prompted the renaming of the park's 'Calamity Canyon' area to 'Mexicana', which remains today.

The layout starts with a large climb up a 45-degree angle lift hill. Once disengaging from the chain you turn right and continue to snake your way down a length of slightly sloped track making 180 degree turns every now and then. Then you travel around an elongated 270 degree right hand turn into a straight. You go up a small slope and then into some brakes. A 180-degree turn follows with a large drop down and up. Another 180-degree right-hand turn follows into a number of air time hills into a building themed to look damaged at which point the on-ride photo is taken. You then travel through another 180 degree turn into another air time hill before going into the final set of brakes which will halt you hard.

Restrictions
Rattlesnake has a height restriction: minimum 1.4 metres, maximum 1.96 metres. There are also chest restrictions for waist measurements 51 inches or above. However, if the lap-bar cannot fit over one's legs, then one cannot ride as they cannot be kept restrained.

The ride is quite rough and jerky, and therefore anyone with back and neck problems cannot ride.

Gallery

See also
Chessington World of Adventures

References

External links
Rattlesnake at ThemeParks-UK

1998 establishments in England
Roller coasters in the United Kingdom
Roller coasters operated by Merlin Entertainments
Chessington World of Adventures rides
Roller coasters introduced in 1998